G. M. Ahmed (born 17 February 1959) is a Pakistani former cricketer. He played three first-class cricket matches for Pakistan Automobiles Corporation between 1983 and 1985.

See also
 List of Pakistan Automobiles Corporation cricketers

References

External links
 

1959 births
Living people
Pakistani cricketers
Pakistan Automobiles Corporation cricketers
Cricketers from Karachi